The 1861 Minnesota gubernatorial election was held on November 5, 1861 to elect the governor of Minnesota. Incumbent Alexander Ramsey was reelected to a second term.

Results

References

1861
Minnesota
gubernatorial
November 1861 events